HMS Archer was an  torpedo cruiser of the British Royal Navy which built by the Glasgow shipbuilder J & G Thomson between 1885 and 1888. She served on overseas stations, including operations off Africa, China and Australia. She was sold for scrap in 1905.

Construction
Archer was laid down at J & G Thomson's Clydebank shipyard on 2 March 1885 as the lead ship of  her class of torpedo cruisers, was launched on 23 December that year and completed by Commander John Ferris on 11 December 1888 in Devonport.

Torpedo cruisers were small, relatively fast, ships intended to defend the fleet against attacks by hostile torpedo boats, while themselves being capable of attacking hostile fleets with torpedoes. The Archer class were enlarged derivatives of the earlier , and carried a heavier armament than the previous class.

Displacement was  normal and  full load.

Armament consisted of six 6-inch (5 ton) guns, backed up by eight 3-pounder QF guns and two machine guns. Three 14-inch torpedo tubes completed the ship's armament. Armour consisted of a  deck, with  gunshields and  protecting the ship's conning tower. The ship had a complement of 176 officers and ratings.

Service
Archer served on the Cape of Good Hope and West Coast of Africa Station from 1889 to 1890. Archer was serving on the China Station in July 1894, when on the eve of the First Sino-Japanese War, Japanese Forces surrounded Seoul. Archer landed an armed party to protect the British Consul-General after a confrontation between him and Japanese troops. She served on the Australia Station from 7 September 1900 until 5 December 1903, under Commander John Philip Rolleston. She was decommissioned in 1905 and sold in April 1905 for £4,800 to Forrester, Swansea for scrap.

Citations

References 
Bastock, John (1988), Ships on the Australia Station, Child & Associates Publishing Pty Ltd; Frenchs Forest, Australia. 

 

1885 ships
Ships built on the River Clyde
Archer-class cruisers
Victorian-era naval ships of the United Kingdom